The name Lannie has been used for two tropical cyclones in the Philippines by the PAGASA in the Western Pacific Ocean.

 Typhoon Talim (2017) (T1720, 20W, Lannie)
 Tropical Storm Lionrock (2021) (T2117, 22W, Lannie)

See also 
 Cyclone Annie, a similar sounding name

Pacific typhoon set index articles